Eikonal is the German form of the Greek word εἰκών, meaning likeness, icon or image. It can refer to:
 Eikonal equation, a non-linear partial differential equation encountered in problems of wave propagation.
 Eikonal approximation, a method of approximation useful in wave scattering equations.
 Operation Eikonal, an operation conducted by the National Security Agency in collaboration with the Bundesnachrichtendienst